Roger Meï (born 3 May 1935) is a French politician.

Meï's grandfather immigrated to France from Tuscany, settling in La Ciotat, where he found work at a shipyard. Meï was born in Hyères on 3 May 1935, and grew up poor on Porquerolles.

Meï was elected mayor of Gardanne in 1977 and served for 43 years, until Hervé Granier replaced in him in 2020. Each of his mayoral opponents had lost in the first round, except during the 1989 election cycle. He was a member of the National Assembly from 1996 to 2002, representing Bouches-du-Rhône's 10th constituency for the French Communist Party.

References

1935 births
Deputies of the 10th National Assembly of the French Fifth Republic
Deputies of the 11th National Assembly of the French Fifth Republic
Mayors of places in Provence-Alpes-Côte d'Azur
People from Hyères
French people of Italian descent
People of Tuscan descent
French Communist Party politicians
Living people